Long Yunzhou (born 15 March 1962) is a Chinese biathlete. He competed in the 20 km individual event at the 1984 Winter Olympics.

References

External links
 

1962 births
Living people
Chinese male biathletes
Olympic biathletes of China
Biathletes at the 1984 Winter Olympics
Place of birth missing (living people)